The 1997 Winston 500 was a NASCAR Winston Cup Series racing event that took place on May 10, 1997, at Talladega Superspeedway in Talladega, Alabama. Heavy rain and prior NASCAR commitments forced this race to be re-scheduled all the way back from April 27, 1997.

This race would be last time that the number 20 would be used on a Winston Cup Series vehicle until Tony Stewart came along and revived the number as a part of Joe Gibbs Racing. Stewart was asked to drive the vehicle just prior to qualifying but had to turn it down due to prior commitments.

Background

Talladega Superspeedway, originally known as Alabama International Motor Superspeedway (AIMS), is a motorsports complex located north of Talladega, Alabama. It is located on the former Anniston Air Force Base in the small city of Lincoln. The track is a Tri-oval and was constructed by International Speedway Corporation, a business controlled by the France Family, in the 1960s. Talladega is most known for its steep banking and the unique location of the start/finish line - located just past the exit to pit road. The track currently hosts the NASCAR series such as the Sprint Cup Series, Xfinity Series, and the Camping World Truck Series.

Race report
There were 43 American-born drivers at this racing event. Those who failed to qualify were: Billy Standridge, Mike Wallace, Gary Bradberry, Joe Nemechek, Phil Barkdoll (in his final NASCAR attempt), and Ed Berrier. Geoffrey Bodine received credit for the last-place finish of the race due to an engine problem on lap 78 of the advertised 188 laps. Mark Martin defeated Dale Earnhardt by almost 0.150 seconds; bringing an end to an uneventful caution-free race. Mark Martin wins two in a row and wins on two of the toughest tracks on the circuit to get wins on. 
The aero packages at the time allowed for 26 changes in the first-place position during the race. Bobby Hillin would acquire his best finish of the 1997 NASCAR Winston Cup Series season by finishing in 20th place after qualifying in second place. This race would be the final start for Greg Sacks in the 20 and Robert Pressley in the 29.

John Andretti, driving Cale Yarborough's car, would finish in the top five. This race was actually rain-delayed from its original date, was attempted on Monday, then set back to the Saturday before Mother's Day.

Joe Nemechek ran the #40 car in this race because Robby Gordon had activities for the Indy 500 that was conflicting with the Winston 500.

Despite being twice the distance this race was only 32 minutes longer than the 2017 I Love New York 355 at The Glen. The cars simply didn't feel the need to use their brakes during the event and rarely went under  due to the lack of cautions. This race brought to a close the existence of Harry Ranier's vaunted race team.

This race was done using restrictor plates per NASCAR's policy on racing at Talladega and its sister track at Daytona Beach, Florida during that time. Lake Speed's ACE Hardware sponsorship in this race completely fabricated so that he would resemble the villain in Fox's made-for-TV movie Steel Chariots. Five years later at the 2002 Aaron's 499, the action at Talladega became slower and with more cautions.

Mark Martin's race speed record still stands as of 2020. Given the reason they set the record was this race going caution free; it is unlikely the record will be broken anytime soon since NASCAR has added mandatory stage break cautions to all races.

After this race, Labonte would take the championship points away from Dale Jarrett. The total prize purse at the race was $1,317,496 ($ when considering inflation); Martin would earn $92,220 ($ when considering inflation).

Qualifying

Top 10 finishers
Section reference: 
 Mark Martin (No. 6)
 Dale Earnhardt (No. 3)
 Bobby Labonte (No. 18)
 John Andretti (No. 98)
 Jeff Gordon (No. 24)
 Terry Labonte (No. 5)
 Jimmy Spencer (No. 23)
 Jeff Burton (No. 99)
 Johnny Benson Jr. (No. 30)
 Ernie Irvan (No. 28)

Timeline
Section reference: 
 Start: John Andretti was leading the starting grid as the green flag was waved.
 Lap 55: Dale Earnhardt took over the lead from Geoffrey Bodine.
 Lap 78: Geoffrey Bodine's engine just could not stand up to the pressures of high-speed racing.
 Lap 85: Ward Burton's engine just could not stand up to the pressures of high-speed racing.
 Lap 90: Rusty Wallace took over the lead from Dale Earnhardt.
 Lap 91: Dale Earnhardt took over the lead from Rusty Wallace.
 Lap 93: Steve Grissom's engine just could not stand up to the pressures of high-speed racing.
 Lap 105: Michael Waltrip took over the lead from Dale Earnhardt.
 Lap 106: Sterling Marlin took over the lead from Michael Waltrip.
 Lap 108: Jeff Burton took over the lead from Sterling Marlin.
 Lap 113: Sterling Marlin's engine just could not stand up to the pressures of high-speed racing.
 Lap 140: Mark Martin took over the lead from Dale Earnhardt.
 Lap 155: Ernie Irvan took over the lead from Mark Martin.
 Lap 157: Jeff Gordon took over the lead from Ernie Irvan.
 Lap 158: Mark Martin took over the lead from Jeff Gordon.
 Lap 169: David Green's engine just could not stand up to the pressures of high-speed racing.
 Lap 180: Rusty Wallace's engine just could not stand up to the pressures of high-speed racing.
 Finish: Mark Martin was officially declared the winner of the event.

Standings after the race

References

Winston 500
Winston 500
NASCAR races at Talladega Superspeedway
April 1997 sports events in the United States